Zeneta is an unincorporated community in Saskatchewan.It is located on the railway between Yarbo and Atwater. It can only be accessed by gravel roads or by train.

Fertile Belt No. 183, Saskatchewan
Unincorporated communities in Saskatchewan
Division No. 5, Saskatchewan